This is a list of songs which reached number one on the  Billboard magazine Mainstream Top 40 chart in 2002. 

During 2002, a total of 13 singles hit number-one on the charts.

See also
2002 in music

Billboard charts
United States Mainstream Top 40
Mainstream Top 40 2002